The following is a list, by period and country, of armed merchant ships used since the late 19th century in the role of auxiliary cruisers, also called armed merchant cruisers.

Ships by period

Spanish–American War

American auxiliary cruisers

Russo-Japanese War

Japanese merchant cruisers

Russian merchant cruisers
Note: This listing is incomplete.

World War I

Allied merchant cruisers

Royal Navy

Royal Australian Navy

French Navy

German auxiliary cruisers

Spanish Civil War
The Spanish Nationalists, whose navy was substantially outnumbered by the Republicans, made an extensive use of auxiliary cruisers during the Spanish civil war, two of them on loan from Italy:

World War II

Allied merchant cruisers
The Armed merchant cruisers were made by requisitioning large ships and providing them with guns and other equipment. The armament varied but six  guns with  guns as secondary was usual. From 1941, many served as troopships.

Royal Australian Navy

Royal New Zealand Navy

Royal Canadian Navy

Royal Navy

French Navy (Marine Nationale)
French auxiliary cruisers were armed with 138 mm, 152 mm or 150 mm guns, 75 mm and 37 mm AA guns and 13.2 mm or 8 mm AA HMG

 (X01)
 (X03)
 (X03)
 (X05)
 (X06)
 (X07) (lost on 6 May 1942)
 (X10)
 (X11)
 (X13)
 (X16)
 (X17)
 (X18)
 (X19)
 (X20)
 (X21)
 (X22) (hit a mine and sunk on 19 June 1940)

German auxiliary cruiser raiders

At the outbreak of war, the Kriegsmarine requisitioned a number of fast merchantmen and immediately sent them into naval shipyards to be converted into offensive auxiliary cruisers. These ships had at the time of building been fitted with extra strong decks specifically to facilitate the installation of military equipment when required, but this was the only difference between them and other merchantmen of the period. No precise plans had been drawn up for the conversion of these ships into warships, and consequently the conversion process was painfully long. Compared to the diversity of British auxiliary cruisers, the Hilfskreuzer were standardized insofar as possible. Most of these merchant raiders carried an Arado Ar 196 floatplane for reconnaissance. In addition to armament, increased fuel, water, and coal storage had to be provided for as well. Furthermore, the raiders could not abandon the crews of their captures, so space had to be provided for prisoners. The first Hilfskreuzer got under way in March 1940, shortly before the Norwegian campaign.

 (HSK-1)
 (HSK-2)
 (HSK-3)
 (HSK-4)
 (HSK-5)
 (HSK-6)
 (HSK-7)
 (HSK-8)
 (HSK-9)
Coronel (HSK-10)
 (HSK-11)

Japanese armed merchant cruisers

Japan converted fourteen merchant ships to "armed merchant cruisers" but, by the end of 1943, five had been sunk and seven had been converted back to merchant ships.

Akagi Maru
Asaka Maru
Awata Maru
Bangkok Maru
Gokoku Maru
Hōkoku Maru
Kinryu Maru
Kiyozumi Maru

Noshiro Maru
Saigon Maru
Ukishima Maru

Italian armed merchant cruisers
Unlike the Germans and the Japanese, none of the armed merchant cruisers (or auxiliary cruisers) of the Italian Royal Navy (Regia Marina) were deployed to destroy or capture Allied merchant ships and were mostly used as supply ships or escorts. All of them mounted two  guns.

 - Lost on 27 February 1941 in battle with cruiser  in the Indian Ocean while fleeing Italian East Africa for Japan as an armed transport.
 - Never active as an Italian armed merchant cruiser and, after being chartered by the Japanese as the Calitea II, lost on 12 January 1945
 - Converted into an escort vessel and never served as an armed merchant cruiser, she took part of the battle of Otranto
 - Converted into a hospital ship and never served as an armed merchant cruiser

Romanian armed merchant cruisers

The Romanian Navy had one auxiliary cruiser, Dacia. She was built in France in 1907 as a passenger ship. She was 109 meters long, her beam was 13 meters and her draught was 8 meters, and displaced 4,105 tons. Initially she was an auxiliary minelayer, armed only with two 20 mm anti-aircraft guns and able to carry up to 200 mines. In 1942 she was also armed with three 105 mm naval/AA guns and designated as auxiliary cruiser (crucişător auxiliar).

References

Notes

Bibliography 

Auxiliary and merchant cruisers
Auxiliary cruisers